Bel-Nor is a northwestern suburban city of St. Louis in St. Louis County, Missouri, United States. The population was 1,499 as of the 2010 census. The events that were the basis for the 1971 novel and 1973 movie The Exorcist have a connection to the village of Bel-Nor. In April 2015, the residents of Bel-Nor voted to become a city.

Geography
Bel-Nor is located at  (38.704001, -90.317353).

Demographics

2010 census
As of the census of 2010, there were 1,499 people, 668 households, and 412 families living in the village. The racial makeup of the village was 48.7% White, 46.4% African American, 2.2% Asian, 0.3% from other races, and 2.3% from two or more races. Hispanic or Latino of any race were 2.3% of the population.

There were 668 households, of which 22.0% had children under the age of 18 living with them, 46.7% were married couples living together, 12.1% had a female householder with no husband present, 2.8% had a male householder with no wife present, and 38.3% were non-families. 31.4% of all households were made up of individuals, and 10.5% had someone living alone who was 65 years of age or older. The average household size was 2.24 and the average family size was 2.81.

The median age in the village was 47.4 years. 16.4% of residents were under the age of 18; 8.6% were between the ages of 18 and 24; 22% were from 25 to 44; 36.5% were from 45 to 64; and 16.5% were 65 years of age or older. The gender makeup of the village was 48.2% male and 51.8% female.

2000 census
As of the census of 2000, there were 1,598 people, 667 households, and 474 families living in the village. The population density was 2,555.5 people per square mile (979.4 per km2). There were 689 housing units at an average density of 1,101.8 per square mile (422.3 per km 2). The racial makeup of the village was 57.20% White, 39.61% African American, 0.94% Asian, 0.25% from other races, and 2.00% from two or more races. Hispanic or Latino of any race were 0.88% of the population.

There were 667 households, out of which 25.6% had children under the age of 18 living with them, 55.0% were married couples living together, 12.6% had a female householder with no husband present, and 28.8% were non-families. 24.4% of all households were made up of individuals, and 8.4% had someone living alone who was 65 years of age or older. The average household size was 2.37 and the average family size was 2.81.

In the village, the population was spread out, with 19.6% under the age of 18, 7.0% from 18 to 24, 25.8% from 25 to 44, 30.4% from 45 to 64, and 17.1% who were 65 years of age or older. The median age was 44 years. For every 100 females, there were 84.7 males. For every 100 females age 18 and over, there were 79.3 males.

The median income for a household in the village was $57,857, and the median income for a family was $77,917. Males had a median income of $46,369 versus $32,625 for females. The per capita income for the village was $46,534. There were 0.3% of families and 1.0% of the population living below the poverty line, including 1.0% of under eighteens and 3.4% of those over 64.

Overview
Bel-Nor incorporated in November 1937 and uses a village form of government with five elected trustees. Bel-Nor provides police service, street maintenance and snow plowing.

The University of Missouri–St. Louis is partially within Bel-Nor. Bel-Nor is also home to Incarnate Word Academy.

The Normandie Golf Club, which claims to be the oldest public golf course west of the Mississippi River, is adjacent to the city. It was created in 1901 as the Normandy Country Club. Recently, village residents have been fighting in court to stop a planned redevelopment of Normandie Golf Course into residential housing.

Police
The Bel-Nor Police Department (BNPD) is responsible for enforcing the Missouri Law and the Municipal Law for the City of Bel-Nor. It consists of a small number of trained officers that come with several years of combined law enforcement experience, and a fleet of two patrol SUV's as well as one patrol car. Bel-Nor officers are known for strict speed enforcement on Natural Bridge Road and are known to assist officers from surrounding agencies including the St. John Police Department, the Breckenridge Hills Police Department, the Woodson Terrace Police Department and the Normandy Police Department on several calls for service due to a mutual aid agreement made with said departments. Bel-Nor officers can also be seen regularly on the UMSL campus, as a section of this campus lies within Bel-Nor. The Bel-Nor Police Department is contracted with the Saint Louis County Police Department for dispatching services.

Film
The film The Exorcist was based on an exorcism that happened within the village of Bel-Nor in 1949.

Notable people
This list may include persons born in the community, past residents, and current residents.
 Mickey Carroll, dwarf actor who portrayed a munchkin in The Wizard of Oz
 Richard Eastham, buried at Oak Grove Cemetery, Bel-Nor 
 Donny Hathaway, buried at Lake Charles Cemetery, Bel-Nor
 George A. Killenberg, Executive Editor of the St. Louis Globe-Democrat
 Napheesa Collier, UConn women's basketball player

References

Villages in St. Louis County, Missouri
Villages in Missouri